The Monéo River is a river of New Caledonia. Along with the Néavin River it has a combined catchment area of 202 square kilometres.

See also
List of rivers of New Caledonia

References

Rivers of New Caledonia